Dusk... and Her Embrace is the second studio album by English extreme metal band Cradle of Filth. It was released on August 28, 1996. and is their first release on the label Music for Nations.

Background 
Much of the material for the album was written while the band were still under Cacophonous Records' contract. Speaking to Ryan Bird of Kerrang! in 2008, Dani Filth remembered:

Filth later told Kerrang! that the tone and content of the record was also partly the result of Cradle's isolation from the European black metal scene:

The album climaxes with a guest speech from Venom's Cronos on the final track, "Haunted Shores".

Release 

Dusk and Her Embrace was released on 28 August 1996 by record label Music for Nations. It charted just outside of the UK top 100, at 107.

Critical reception 
Critical reception of this album has been generally positive. AllMusic wrote: "Dusk and Her Embrace may be [Cradle of Filth's] finest moment." In 2021, it was elected by Metal Hammer as the 4th best symphonic metal album of all time.

Track listing

Personnel 
All information from the album booklet.

Cradle of Filth
 Dani Filth – lead vocals
 Stuart Anstis – guitars
 Gian Pyres – guitars (credited, but doesn't play on the album), songwriting on "Nocturnal Supremacy '96"
 Robin Graves – bass
 Damien Gregori – keyboards
 Nicholas Barker – drums
 Sarah Jezebel Deva – backing vocals

Additional musicians
 Cronos – additional vocals on "Haunted Shores"
 Danielle Cneajna Cottington – backing vocals

Production
 Kit Woolven – producer
 Dan Sprigg – engineering
 Mike "Exorcist" Exeter – engineering
 Sato Devinn – effects
 Eileen – cover model
 Nigel Wingrove – art direction
 Simon Marsden – photography
 Chris Bell – photography
 Salvatore – artwork
 Mez – artwork, layout

Charts

Dusk and Her Embrace: The Original Sin

Dusk... and Her Embrace exists in two versions. It was initially recorded as the band's second album for Cacophonous records following The Principle of Evil Made Flesh. Cradle's relationship with Cacophonous subsequently collapsed, however: the band accusing the label of contractual and financial mismanagement. Acrimonious legal proceedings took up most of 1995, and the original version of Dusk was shelved and later re-worked and re-recorded as the eventual 1996 Music For Nations release. Writing in The Gospel of Filth in 2009, Dani indicated that these early recordings were merely demos, rather than a finished album:

Dani Filth revealed plans for a 20th anniversary release of the original 1995 Cacophonous recordings in 2015, and a release date was officially announced in 2016. Filth told Team Rock:

The title for the new release was Dusk... and Her Embrace: The Original Sin. It was released on CD and digital on 8 July 2016. A vinyl version, limited to 666 copies, followed on 10 October 2016. The liner notes confirm that the lineup for this version was almost the same as for The Principle of Evil Made Flesh, including Paul Allender, Paul Ryan and Benjamin Ryan, but excluding Robin Graves, who was shortly replaced by Jon Kennedy. Allender, the Ryan brothers and Kennedy all left the band before the 1996 version of Dusk... was recorded.

Track listing

Personnel 
 Cradle of Filth
 Dani Filth – lead vocals
 Paul Allender – lead guitar
 Paul Ryan – rhythm guitar
 Jon Kennedy – bass
 Nicholas Barker – drums
 Benjamin Ryan – keyboards 
 Sarah Jezebel Deva – backing vocals
 Danielle Cneajna Cottington – backing vocals

 Guest/session musicians
 Steve Grimmett – vocals ("Arthurian Wails") on "Haunted Shores"
 Cronos – vocals ("Rabid Captor of Bestial Malevolence") on "Haunted Shores"

 Production
Andy Reilly, Mike Cowling, Zakk Bajjon – producer, engineer
Scott Atkins – mastering (2016)
Drake Mefestta, Frater Nihil, Dani Filth – sleeve art, art direction, design and layout

References

External links 
 

Cradle of Filth albums
1996 albums
Music for Nations albums